In economics, Present value interest factor, also known by the acronym PVIF, is used in finance theory to refer to the output of a calculation, used to determine the monthly payment needed to repay a loan.  The calculation has a number of variable factors, which include the quantity borrowed, the given interest rate, the number of regular intervals at which the loan is to be repaid and the term of the loan.  For example, if person borrows a lump of money, valued at W, due to be repaid at X intervals per year, at an annual interest rate of Y, for Z years, then the regular payment that will repay this loan can be calculated as follows:

Formula
Let:
 = the amount borrowed
 = the number of regular intervals per year at which time the borrowed amount is to be repaid
 = the annual interest rate charged
 = the number of years over which the loan will be outstanding
 = the amount of the regular payment that will "amortize" the loan

Then:

A = W / PVIFA(X, Y, Z)

See also
Annuity (financial contracts)
Fixed rate mortgage
Amortization calculator

References

PVIFA
Interest